Dwight House is a Grade II listed house at 38 Burlington Road, Fulham, London, built in the late 18th century.

References

External links

Grade II listed buildings in the London Borough of Hammersmith and Fulham
Houses in the London Borough of Hammersmith and Fulham
Fulham